Harry or Henry Waller may refer to:
 Harry Waller (footballer, born 1917) (1917–1984), English footballer
 Harry Waller (footballer, born 1902) (1902–1982), English footballer
 Harry Waller (MP)
 Henry Waller (c. 1587–1631), MP for City of London